Church of Our Lady of the Rosary, is a Roman Catholic church in New Julfa, Iran. It is located in Kocher neighbourhood of New Julfa, next to the Armenian Church of St. Nerses.

History 

In 1657, Italian Dominicans, with the help of Catholic Armenians started their existence in New Julfa. This church was established in 1681 and dedicated to Our Lady of the Rosary' and later in 1705, it was rebuilt and enlarged.  During 18th century, the last Dominicans left New Julfa, leaving church in the care of the few remaining Armenian Catholics. In 1903, French Lazarists took charge of the church and built a school close to the church. Later, they moved to Isfahan city centre and once again left the church in the care of the small community of Catholic Armenians. After the migration of Catholic Armenians to Tehran, the Church of Our Lady of the Rosary was abandoned and fell into disrepair. Finally in 2005 the church was totally renovated.

See also
Christianity in the Safavid Empire
Catholic Church in Iran
Roman Catholic Archdiocese of Ispahan
Armenian Catholic Eparchy of Isfahan

References 

Architecture in Iran
Churches in Isfahan
Roman Catholic churches in Iran
Dominican churches
Tourist attractions in Isfahan